Abdul Bagui Butu Rasul (1865 – February 22, 1937), better known as Hadji Butu, was a Filipino statesman, politician and senator during the 4th, 6th, 7th, and 8th Philippine Legislatures, representing the 12th senatorial district.

References 

1865 births
1937 deaths
Politicians from Sulu
Filipino Freemasons
Senators of the 4th Philippine Legislature
Senators of the 6th Philippine Legislature
Senators of the 7th Philippine Legislature
Senators of the 8th Philippine Legislature